Ipswich Grammar School is an independent, non-denominational, day and boarding school for boys, located in Ipswich, a city situated on the Bremer River in South East Queensland, Australia. The school is sited on the eponymous Grammar School Hill, with its original buildings occupying the crown of the hill. Some of the Ipswich Grammar School Buildings are listed on the Queensland Heritage Register.

Founded in 1863, Ipswich Grammar was the first secondary school established in the colony of Queensland under the Grammar Schools Act 1860, but a small number of other schools were already offering secondary education in Queensland. Today the school operates a P to 12 educational model, offering preparatory, primary and secondary education to approximately 1,080 students, including 105 boarders.

Ipswich Grammar School is affiliated with the Australian Boarding Schools Association (ABSA), the Junior School Heads Association of Australia (JSHAA), Independent Schools Queensland (AISQ), the Association of Heads of Independent Schools of Australia (AHISA), and is a founding member of the Great Public Schools Association of Queensland Inc. (GPS).

History

Background 
Ipswich Grammar School was the first of ten grammar schools established under the Grammar Schools Act, passed by Queensland's first parliament in 1860. The Act allowed for the establishment of a grammar school in any town where £1000 could be raised locally. At the time of the Act, there was a push for the new system of education in Queensland to be free of denominationalism. The Grammar Schools Act was passed to reflect this.

Despite these intentions of the legislation, it was the Roman Catholic Bishop Quinn who, by mid-1861, had raised sufficient funds to open Grammar Schools in both Brisbane and Ipswich. Amidst an outcry from the Protestant section of the community, Bishop Quinn was informed by the Executive Council of Queensland that the intention of the legislation was to establish Grammar Schools on strictly non-sectarian principles. This decision may have been influenced by the fact that not a single member of either House of the Legislature in Queensland at the time was a Roman Catholic.

Establishment 

Unperturbed, the Roman Catholic community in Ipswich raised the full amount of £1000. On 20 August 1861, the first meeting concerning the establishment of a Grammar School in Ipswich took place. Around 200 people attended.

It seems that despite the drive of the Roman Catholic's to establish a school under their denomination, the majority of people did not support the establishment of a school where one religion would predominate. Trouble erupted when a resolution was put forward that members of each religious denomination be appointed to a committee to make preparations for the new Grammar School. A member of the Roman Catholic group suggested that they would withdraw their funds if they did not get their own way – and the meeting ended in turmoil, with a brawl taking place. In the week following this first meeting, newspapers reported clashes in the streets of Ipswich between Roman Catholics and the Protestants.

On 27 August 1861, one week after the initial meeting, a second meeting regarding the Grammar School was held at the Ipswich Court House. Around 600 people attended. A local newspaper, The Ipswich Herald and General Advertiser, records it as "the largest and noisiest ever held in Ipswich". At one stage, police were called to settle another brawl that had broken out between the various religious groups.

It was in this turbulent spirit that a resolution for the establishment of IGS was passed, by 281 votes to 199. The Roman Catholic group promptly withdrew their financial support, and it would be March 1862 before the community of Ipswich would raise the £1000 required.

The first Board of Trustees, elected on 25 March 1862, called for plans and specifications to be submitted for the new school building. Architect Benjamin Backhouse made the only submission, and after a small problem with his initial design was overcome (he had forgotten to make provision for toilets), the plan was accepted. The original building (known as the Great Hall) was designed in a revival gothic style, and it was constructed by contractors John Ferguson and David McLaughlin.

Early years 

IGS was opened on 25 September 1863 by Sir George Ferguson Bowen, Governor of Queensland. The School opened with 16 students, 4 staff and the inaugural Headmaster, Stuart Hawthorne, a graduate of the University of Sydney.

The first curriculum reflected the traditional Grammar School education – it included Latin and Greek classics, mathematics, the various branches of liberal English education and, when circumstances permitted, teaching of the German and French languages. Student numbers fluctuated during the initial years, but settled between 70 and 80 in the 1870s.

By the start of the 20th century, 36 students had graduated from IGS to various universities around Australia. In this time, a number of other Queensland grammar schools had opened, some under the auspices of the Grammar Schools Act – in the immediate region, these included Brisbane Grammar School in 1868, Gregory Terrace in 1875, Toowoomba Grammar School in 1877 and Nudgee College in 1891.

When competition with Brisbane Grammar commenced, Australian rules football was the chosen code. The first competitive match between the two schools was played in 1870 under these rules – the outcome was a draw. These early games were exceptionally long – the match between IGS and Brisbane Grammar in 1876 commenced at 10.30am and ended at 2.30pm, at which time IGS had scored 6 goals to Brisbane Grammar's nil.

Incidentally, rugby union was adopted as the official code in 1887, only to be replaced by rugby league when the Queensland Great Public Schools (GPS) system commenced in 1918. In 1928, the code was again changed to rugby union, where it has since stayed, although due to popular demand, Aussie Rules was reintroduced in 1995 as part of the Independent Schools Australian Rules Football Competition.

Competitions between the Grammar Schools in these years became more frequent. In 1878, the first Inter-Grammar School sports held for Athletics were held, with IGS prevailing over Brisbane Grammar School and Toowoomba Grammar School. IGS won two successive grammar school rowing regattas in 1891 and 1892, but floods in Ipswich destroyed the School's rowing shed and equipment and IGS has not competed in rowing competition since.

The first tennis match between IGS and Brisbane Grammar was played in 1893, with IGS emerging victorious. IGS also claimed victory in the first cricket match between the two schools – but the actual scores have been lost.

Middle years 

By the time of the silver jubilee of IGS in 1913, attended by Sir William MacGregor, Governor of Queensland, the School had erected an Honour Board, new boarding facilities and a Science Block, leading to the teaching of physics and chemistry in a laboratory. The Chelmsford Cup series (the precursor to the GPS system, named after then Governor of Queensland, The Lord Chelmsford) was established in 1907 for competition between the existing Grammar Schools, and the inauguration of the Old Boys Association followed the next year. The University of Queensland was opened in Brisbane in 1909, improving student attendance.

The Chelmsford Cup series existed alongside the new Great Public Schools, or GPS, system from 1918 to 1938, at which time it was discontinued in favour of GPS. In 1925, the first sports ground at IGS was opened. The first game to be played on this field was a football match between past and present students – the result was a 3-all draw. IGS added swimming and tennis facilities and a second sports ground in the 1930s.

IGS produced three Rhodes scholars between 1922 and 1924, and had produced five prior to World War II. The connection of electricity and addition of four new classroom blocks in the 1920s meant that by 1930, student numbers had risen to around 200.

Post-World War II 

IGS grew notably following World War II – additional boarding facilities, in the form of the Murray Hancock Memorial Block, were created in 1946; the War Memorial Library was opened in 1947; and Preparatory School buildings were added in 1955. The large central classroom block, which was constructed at a cost of over £100,000, was opened in 1961 – and is still used prominently today.

More growth was to follow, with the Manual Training facilities and an on-campus hospital added in 1967, biology block opened in 1970, the R.G. Edmondson Memorial Open Air Theatre and the Gilmore Wilson Memorial School of Music opened and dedicated in 1977 and the Physical Education and Sports Complex opened in 1980.

During the 1980s, the school constructed manual arts and science facilities, automated its library and other resources, purchased the  historic Woodlands estate in the nearby suburb of Marburg and signed a cooperation agreement with its sister school in Japan, Gifu Daiichi High School. The decade was to end in sadness, however, as Headmaster Alan Ladley died suddenly on the final school day of 1989.

The 1990s saw IGS adopt a number of commercial activities – a common theme through a number of the GPS Schools. The Grammar Park Housing Estate was started in 1991 in a nearby suburb of Ipswich, and later the Grammar Park Sports Fields and a hospitality complex was added. IGS expanded its teaching into year 7 (traditionally a primary school year level in Queensland) in 1994. Years 4 to 6 were added later, in conjunction with Ipswich Girls Grammar School, and in 2006 the school began operating services for pre-school to year 3.

The School, in conjunction with Griffith University, has developed a Learning Made Easy program to underline all aspects of the IGS education. The program is embedded in all curriculum areas, and has been marketed overseas.

In 2020, a new STEM building was added to facilitate the schools growing population of students in engineering, biology, physics and more. Costing around $10 million, it consists of three storeys, in which include a lecture theatre, several labs, designated "study areas" and a balcony.

Headmasters

Campus 

The original school buildings from the 1860s still sit on the crown of Grammar School Hill, with the original building now known as the 'Great Hall'. These buildings are now listed by the National Trust of Australia. The school grounds themselves have undergone a notable transformation in recent years, with the most significant change being the introduction of the Igor Lapa Junior School. Now included within the Igor Lapa Junior School is a full indoor sand volleyball pit and some basketball hoops with cricket pitches marked out on them. Some further extensions have been made to the junior school due to the new attendance of prep to grade three. Recently, the Board of Trustees approved expansion of the Prep buildings, and refurbishment of the remaining Tennis Court at Ipswich Grammar's main campus.

Due to this expansion of the Prep building over the Tennis courts, additional Courts have been made at the school's externally owned land in Brassall. This land is usually used for cross country, cricket, rugby and soccer in the appropriate seasons. Eight new Tennis courts were constructed at the Brassall grounds during the 2008 Christmas break for GPS competition and training for the students.

Ipswich Grammar School, recently occupied the services of Stonestreets Coaches and Doyles Coaches, to do the school's charter routes.

GPS membership 
IGS is a member of the Great Public Schools Association of Queensland, better known as the GPS, which was established in 1918. IGS was one of the founding members. Today, nine schools are involved in the GPS system, being IGS, Nudgee College, Gregory Terrace, Brisbane Grammar School, Toowoomba Grammar School, Anglican Church Grammar School, Brisbane State High School, The Southport School and Brisbane Boys' College. Thirteen formal GPS Activities are engaged in between the schools, with Premierships for each activity awarded each year.

Despite being among the smaller of the GPS Schools in terms of student attendance, IGS performs well in a number of GPS competitions, chief amongst them the annual Track and Field competition, which was claimed by Ipswich Grammar thirteen times in fifteen years from 1998 through 2012, only losing two premierships in this reign. Both losses were to Nudgee College, by two points in 2006 and seven points in 2010. In 2020, the school almost broke the record for the most points ever score, only needing 0.5 points to tie with the record, in another premiership for IGS in 2020, 3rd in a row after 2018 and 2019 ended up in success for the school.

House system 
As with most Australian schools, Ipswich Grammar School utilises a house system, whereby students are members of one of six houses for the purposes of intra-school activities. These houses, named after six of the longest serving Headmasters, are Hawthorne (yellow), Cameron (sky blue), Lawrence (red), Kerr (green), Henderson (black) and Ladley (royal blue). Students are allocated to a house on entry to the school and generally remain in the same house for their entire time at the school. Senior year students assist teachers in managing the students during events.

Leadership 
In addition to the Year 12 students, the school elects one school captain, one vice-captain, a boarding captain and vice-captain. To assist these students a number of Year 12 prefects are elected. , some Year 11 students are elected as prefect at the start of Semester 2, to assist the Year 12s.

Alumni

Alumni of Ipswich Grammar School are known as 'Old Boys'

Museum and archive 
Ipswich Grammar School has a Museum and Archive, established to preserve the history of the school, students and faculty. The Museum operates onsite in The Great Hall and is open to the public during school terms.

See also
List of schools in Queensland
List of boarding schools

References

External links 

Educational institutions established in 1863
High schools in Queensland
Boarding schools in Queensland
Boys' schools in Queensland
Nondenominational Christian schools in Queensland
Junior School Heads Association of Australia Member Schools
Schools in Ipswich, Queensland
1863 establishments in Australia
Great Public Schools Association of Queensland